Alwa may refer to :

 Places
 al-Alwa, a village in southern Al-Hasakah Governorate, northeastern Syria
 Alodia, a kingdom of Christian Nubia, south of Nobatia and Makuria
 Alwa Mehwa, a village and former Mehwal (petty princely state) in Gujarat, western India

 Music
 Alwa (folk music group), Swedish folk group

 Fictional character in 
 Lulu (opera)
 Pandora's Box (play)
 Pandora's Box (1929 film) 

 Acronym ALWA
 The Albanian League of Writers and Artists (Albanian: Lidhja e Shkrimtarëve dhe e Artistëve)